Xyronomys is an extinct genus of small mammals from the Paleocene of North America, with two described species. The genus lies within the extinct order Multituberculata within the suborder Cimolodonta and family Neoplagiaulacidae.

The species Xyronomys swainae (J. K. Rigby, 1980) was found in Torrejonian (Paleocene)-age strata of Swain Quarry in Wyoming, United States. Represented by a couple of teeth, this genus was originally assigned to Eucosmodontidae. Kielan-Jaworowska and Hurum (2001, p. 406) refer it to Neoplagiaulacidae on the basis of its possession of microprismatic enamel, i.e. the tooth enamel is built up from small prisms.

A second species Xyronomys robinsoni was found in Puercan (Lower Paleocene)-age strata of Colorado, USA and was named by Middleton and Dewar in 2004.

Material assigned to this genus has also been reported from Rav W-1 in Saskatchewan, Canada.

References

 Kielan-Jaworowska, Z. and Hurum, J.H. (2001), "Phylogeny and Systematics of multituberculate mammals", Paleontology 44:389-429.
 Rigby, J.K. (1980), "Swain Quarry of the Fort Union Formation, Middle Paleocene (Torrejonian), Carbon County, Wyoming: geologic setting and mammalian fauna", Evolutionary Monographs 3, vi +179pp.
 Much of this information has been derived from Mesozoic Mammals: Ptilodontoidea, an Internet directory.

Ptilodontoids
Paleocene mammals
Paleocene genus extinctions
Extinct mammals of North America
Fossil taxa described in 1980
Prehistoric mammal genera